XCD can refer to:

 XCD, ISO 4217 currency code for the East Caribbean dollar
 Champforgeuil Airport (IATA code)
 Xerez Club Deportivo, Spanish football club
 Bajaj XCD, 125cc bike by Bajaj Auto of India, released in 2007
 Xuchang East railway station, China Railway pinyin code XCD